Adelina may refer to:

Geography
 Adelina, Opole Lubelskie County, Poland
 Adelina, Maryland, U.S.
 Adelina, Hrubieszów County, Poland

Other
 Adelina (name), including a list of people with the name
 Adelina (Apicomplexa), a genus of parasitic, eukaryotic microorganisms
 Adelina (beetle), a genus of darkling beetles
 Adelina (opera), an 1810 opera farsa by Pietro Generali, libretto by Gaetano Rossi

See also 
 Adelina Patti Theatre, a Welsh opera house
 Adeline (disambiguation)
 Villa Adelina, Argentina